There were initially 471 King George V Playing Fields in the United Kingdom. 
Details of all the current King George V Fields can be found here

England
List of King George V Playing Fields in England

Northern Ireland

Scotland

Wales

Ceredigion  - Cardigan.

References

 
Monuments and memorials in the United Kingdom
Lists of parks in the United Kingdom
UK